Cill Dara RFC is an Irish rugby club based in Kildare, Leinster, playing in Division 1B of the Leinster League. The club's colours are a combination of red, white and black.

History
Rev. Father E.D. O' Connor, O. Carm, and former president, Joe Flanagan, were the driving forces behind the founding of the club in 1976. The club affiliated to the Leinster Branch of the IRFU the next year.

The fledgling club found little success in their first seasons, but did  field two teams.

The club grew over the next 40 years and counts Fergus McFadden as a former youth player. It currently has over 200 mini and youth members and fields two senior men's and one senior women's teams in an amalgamation with Naas, Newbridge, and Portarlington rugby clubs.

The president is Conor Byrne.

References
 Cill Dara RFC

Irish rugby union teams
Kildare (town)
Rugby clubs established in 1976
Rugby union clubs in County Kildare